Blue Shaddy is an Australian blues/roots band who formed in 1999.

Biography

Blue Shaddy have independently released four albums and have received national airplay on Triple J. 
The group has been showcased in the United States through Tin Records. Blue Shaddy was nominated for the Tin Records 2007 New Music compilation.

Singer songwriter and guitarist Jim McClelland, his brother Graham McClelland (harmonica) and Sandra McClelland (bass guitarist and wife of Jim) were born and bred in Western Australia's remote wheat belt, which has had a strong influence on their music, especially songs such as "Don't wanna die here" and "People talk". Having lived in the city of Perth for some 14 years and meeting band members, Malaysian born Arun Satgunasingam (drummer and percussionist) and percussionist Sri Lankan born Kanchana Karunaratna, the band has been exposed to new influences which leads to what Blue Shaddy are today.

Awards
The band enjoyed the Number 1 spot on the Perth Indie Charts in May 2007 with their album Walk A Mile, and were nominated in the Blue Star Awards.

Selected performances
The West Coast Blues and Roots Festival, 2005, 2006, 2007
The East Coast Blues and Roots Festival, 2007
Blues on Broadbeach 2007
The Australian Blues Awards 2007
The Bridgetown Blues Festival consecutively for 6 years (as of 2007)
The UBlues blues/roots & soul Festival, Singapore 2002 & 2003
The Vintage Blues and Roots Festival, Albany (2005, 2006, 2007)
The Mordialloc Festival Melbourne 2006
Whale Shark Festival, Exmouth 2006

Members
 Jim McClelland: vocals, guitar(acoustic and lap slide guitars), stomp box
 Sandy McClelland: electric bass guitar
 Graham McClelland: harmonica
 Arun Satgunasingam: drums, percussion
 Kanchana Karunaratna: percussion.

Discography
 Blue Shaddy – Independent (1999)
 Blue Shaddy ... Live. Fine Time... – Independent (2002)
 Walk a Mile – Independent (October 2004)
 Bury My Ghost – Independent (January 2008)
Across The Road - Independent 2011

References

External links
Blue Shaddy official website
 Blue Shaddy Myspace

Australian folk music groups
Western Australian musical groups
Musical groups established in 2001
People from Kellerberrin, Western Australia
2001 establishments in Australia